Hans-Peter Feldmann (born 1941 in Düsseldorf, Germany) is a German visual artist. Feldmann's approach to art-making is one of collecting, ordering and re-presenting.

Early life and career
In the 1960s, Feldmann studied painting at the University of Arts and Industrial Design Linz in Austria. He began working in 1968, producing the first of the small handmade books that would become a signature part of his work. These modest books, simply entitled Bilde (Picture) or Bilder (Pictures), would include one or more reproductions from a certain type—knees of women, shoes, chairs, film stars, etc.--their subjects isolated in their ubiquity and presented without captions. In 1979 Feldmann decided to pull out of the art world and just make books and pictures for himself. In 1989 the curator Kasper König persuaded Feldmann to exhibit in a gallery again.

Work
Hans-Peter Feldmann is a figure in the conceptual art movement and practitioner in the artist book and multiple formats. Feldmann's approach to art-making is one of collecting, ordering and re-presenting amateur snapshots, print photographic reproductions, toys and trivial works of art. Feldmann reproduces and recontextualizes our reading of them in books, postcards, posters or multiples.

Feldmann made his first series of books between 1968 and 1971. Works from the early 1970s include 70 snapshots depicting All the Clothes of a Woman and four Time Series projects including, for example, a row of 36 pictures of a ship moving along a river. Feldmann's series Photographs Taken From Hotel Room Windows While Traveling clusters 108 nondescript, unframed snapshots of buildings, streets and parking lots. (Like other Feldmann projects, this calls to mind Ed Ruscha's photographic catalogs.) 11 Left Shoes presents 11 shoes borrowed from 303 Gallery employees, in a row on the floor. Que Sera has the words of the song of that title handwritten on the wall. Bed With Photograph simulates part of a hotel room with a slept-in bed, a side table and a framed photograph of a woman in leopard-print pants.

Feldman's photographic essays might have a more intimate singularity in book form. His book Secret Picturebook (1973) is a thick, densely printed, scholarly tome with little pictures of women's torsos in sexy underwear inserted at intervals. It most pointedly embodies the artist's mischievous relationship to high culture. Another book, “1967-1993 Die Toten” reproduces images from newspapers of all of the lives lost due to the violence and terrorism that permeated contemporary German history.

Creating carefully conceived installations from everyday images is what Feldmann is best known for. In 2004-5 MoMA P.S. 1 showed “100 Years,” an exhibition made up of 101 photographic portraits of people ages 8 months to 100 years. And at the International Center of Photography in 2008 he filled a room with the framed front pages of 100 newspapers — from New York, Paris, Dubai, Sydney, Seoul and elsewhere — printed on Sept. 12, 2001.

Recognition
Hans-Peter Feldmann has been named winner of the eighth Biennal Hugo Boss Prize in 2010. This prize includes an exhibition at the Solomon R. Guggenheim Museum, New York, in May 2011.

Collections
Feldmann's work features in prominent private and public collections, such as that of the Fotomuseum Winterthur and the MACBA in Barcelona. In 2012, the artist donated one of his key work, Die Toten (The Dead), to the Berlin State Museums in Berlin.

Art market
Hans Peter Feldmann is represented by Mehdi Chouakri Gallery in Berlin,  Simon Lee Gallery in London, Galerie Francesca Pia in Zürich, Galerie Martine Aboucaya in Paris and 303 Gallery in New York. He does not limit the number of editions of his works, nor does he sign them.

Exhibitions
1972 - Billeder af Feldmann (Bilder von Feldmann), Daner Galleriet, Copenhagen, Denmark
1977 - Eine Stadt: Essen, Museum Folkwang Essen
1990 - Hans-Peter Feldmann, das Museum im Kopf, Portikus, Frankfurt; Kunstverein für die Rheinlande und Westfalen, Düsseldorf
1999 - Hans-Peter Feldmann: Bücher, Neues Museum Weserburg Bremen
2001 - Hans-Peter Feldmann, 100 Jahre, Museum Folkwang Essen 2001
2001 - Hans-Peter Feldmann 272 pages, Fundacio Antoni Tàpies Barcelona
2002 - Hans-Peter Feldman 272 pages, Centre nationale de la photographie Paris, Fotomuseum Winterthur
2006 - Hans-Peter Feldmann in der Antikensammlung der Kunsthalle zu Kiel, Kunsthalle Kiel der Christian Albrechts-Universität, Schleswig-Holsteinischer Kunstverein Kiel
2007 - Hans-Peter Feldmann, Museum am Ostwall in Dortmund, Die Toten, RAF bis heute
2007 - Hans-Peter Feldmann, Skulptur Projekte Münster 2007, Sanierung, bzw. Neugestaltung der Toilettenanlagen am Domplatz
2010 - Hans-Peter Feldmann, Malmö Konsthall, Malmö, Sweden
2010 - An Art Exhibition, Museo Nacional Centro de Arte Reina Sofía MNCARS, Madrid, Spain
2010 - Hans-Peter Feldmann, Pinakothek der Moderne, Munich, Germany
2010 - Les Rencontres d'Arles, France.
2010 - Kunsthalle Düsseldorf, Düsseldorf.
2012 - Hans-Peter Feldmann, Serpentine Galleries, London.

Survey exhibitions
1972 - documenta 5, Kassel/Germany
1975 - Biennale de la Jeunesse, Paris/France
1977 - documenta 6, Kassel/Germany
2003 - Biennale di Venezia/Italy
2009 - Biennale di Venezia/Italy
2010 - Museum für Moderne Kunst (MMK), Frankfurt/Germany
2010 - Ruhrblicke, Zeche Zollverein, Essen/Germany
2010- Dublin Contemporary

Publications (selected) 
 Eine Stadt. Essen. Ausst.-Kat. Museum Folkwang, Essen 1977
 Hans-Peter Feldmann: Telefonbuch. AQ-Verlag, Dudweiler 1980. 
 Hans-Peter Feldmann: Das Museum im Kopf. Ausst.-Kat. Frankfurt, Düsseldorf. Walther König, Köln 1989. 
 Hans-Peter Feldmann: Eine Firma, Siemens. München 1991
 Hans-Peter Feldmann: Arbeiten. Kunstverein Heinsberg 1991
 Hans-Peter Feldmann: Kunstgeschichten. Paris 1992
 Hans-Peter Feldmann: Portrait. Schirmer/Mosel München 1994
 Hans-Peter Feldmann: Ferien, Secession. Wien 1994
 Hans-Peter Feldmann: Voyeur 1.Aufl. La Fleche 1994
 Hans-Peter Feldmann: Voyeur 2.Aufl. König, Köln 1997
 Hans-Peter Feldmann: Ein Energieunternehmen, EVN. Maria Enzersdorf 1997
 Hans-Peter Feldmann: Die Toten. Düsseldorf  1998
 Hans-Peter Feldmann: Bücher. Ausst.-Kat. Neues Museum Weserburg Bremen 1999 (Serie Sammlung der Künstlerbücher Bd. 23). 
 Hans-Peter Feldmann: Alle Kleider einer Frau. Düsseldorf - Toronto 1999
 Hans-Peter Feldmann, C. Konrad: Die Johanneskirche in Düsseldorf. 1999
 Hans-Peter Feldmann: Graz. Camera Austria 2000
 Hans-Peter Feldmann: Profil ohne Worte. 2 Magazine 2000
 Hans-Peter Feldmann: 100 Jahre. Anlässlich der Ausstellung im Museum Folkwang Essen. Schirmer/Mosel, München 2001. 
 Celine Duval, Hans-Peter Feldmann: cahier d’images. 7 Magazine 2001
 Hans-Peter Feldmann: Bilder / Pictures. 2002
 Helena Tatay: Hans-Peter Feldmann 272 pages, Ausst.-Kat. Centre nationale de la photographie Paris u.a.  (Englisch-Deutsch)
 Hans-Peter Feldmann: Vistas desde habitaciones de hotel. Barcelona 2003
 Hans-Peter Feldmann: 1941. Düsseldorf  2003
 Hans-Peter Feldmann: Babel ‘About Beauty’. Berlin 2004
 Hans-Peter Feldmann: Das kleine Mövenbuch. Walther König, Köln 2004
 Hans-Peter Feldmann: Abstrakte Kunst. Salon Verlag 2004
 Hans-Peter Feldmann: Frauen im Gefängnis. Walther König, Köln 2005
 Hans-Peter Feldmann: Paris. Salon Verlag 2005
 Hans-Peter Feldmann: Liebe/Love. Walther König, Köln 2006
 Hans-Peter Feldmann: Die beunruhigenden Musen. Hans-Peter Feldmann in der Antikensammlung der Kunsthalle zu Kiel. Ausst.-Kat. Kunsthalle Kiel, Schleswig-Holsteinischer Kunstverein, Kiel. Walther König, Köln 2006. 
 Hans-Peter Feldmann: Birgit. Contemporary Art Gallery, Vancouver 2006
 Hans-Peter Feldmann: Blau. Walther König, Köln 2006
 Hans-Peter Feldmann: Zeitungsphotos. Walther König, Köln 2006
 Hans-Peter Feldmann: Foto. Galerie Langhans, Praha 2006
 Hans-Peter Feldmann: Voyeur 3.Aufl.. König, Köln 2006
 Hans-Peter Feldmann: Buch / Book # 9. Sprengel Museum Hannover 2007
 Hans-Peter Feldmann: Smoke. Walther König, Köln 2007
 Hans-Peter Feldmann: Album. Walther König, Köln 2008
 Hans-Peter Feldmann: Voyeur 4.Auflage. Walther König, Köln 2009
 Hans-Peter Feldmann: Interview zusammen mit Hans Ulrich Obrist. Walther König, Köln 2009

References

External links 
Hans-Peter Feldmann information at 303 Gallery

Kurzbiographie Biography
Skulptur-projekte
Simon Lee Gallery, London Selected Works, Simon Lee Gallery
Hans-Peter Feldmann 2012 exhibition at the Serpentine Galleries

1941 births
Living people
German contemporary artists